William James Lindberg (December 17, 1904 – December 15, 1981) was a United States district judge of the United States District Court for the Eastern District of Washington and the United States District Court for the Western District of Washington.

Education and career

Born in Minot, North Dakota, Lindberg received a Bachelor of Laws from Gonzaga University School of Law in 1927 and a Master of Laws from Georgetown Law in 1928. He was a clerk for United States Senator Clarence Dill in 1928. He was in private practice in Spokane, Washington from 1928 to 1933. He was a professor of law at Gonzaga University School of Law from 1928 to 1933. He was Secretary for the Washington State Senate in 1933. He was an assistant state attorney general of Washington from 1933 to 1934. He was a member of the Washington State Liquor Control Board from 1934 to 1941. He was in private practice in Olympia, Washington from 1941 to 1944. He was in private practice in Seattle, Washington from 1944 to 1951.

Federal judicial service

Lindberg was nominated by President Harry S. Truman on March 12, 1951, to a joint seat on the United States District Court for the Eastern District of Washington and the United States District Court for the Western District of Washington vacated by Judge Lloyd Llewellyn Black. He was confirmed by the United States Senate on April 24, 1951, and received his commission on April 25, 1951. He served as Chief Judge of the Western District from 1959 to 1971. He was a member of the Judicial Conference of the United States from 1960 to 1963. On May 19, 1961, he was reassigned by operation of law to serve in the Western District only. He assumed senior status on March 1, 1971. Lindberg served in that capacity until his death on December 15, 1981.

References

Sources
 

1904 births
1981 deaths
Gonzaga University School of Law alumni
Georgetown University Law Center alumni
Judges of the United States District Court for the Western District of Washington
Judges of the United States District Court for the Eastern District of Washington
United States district court judges appointed by Harry S. Truman
20th-century American judges